Yechiel Lerer (1910–1943) was a Yiddish poet.

Lerer lived in the Warsaw Ghetto and participated in the ghetto literary activity. He was involved in the periodical Hamadrikh (Hebrew: "The Guide"). Yechiel was murdered in the Treblinka extermination camp.

References

1910 births
1943 deaths
Yiddish-language poets
Warsaw Ghetto inmates
Polish people who died in Treblinka extermination camp
People from Mińsk County
Polish Jews who died in the Holocaust